Peziza domiciliana, commonly known as the domicile cup fungus, is a species of fungus in the genus Peziza, family Pezizaceae. Described by English mycologist Mordecai Cubitt Cooke, the fungus grows on rotten wood, drywall/plasterboard, and plaster in homes, damp cellars, and basements. It is known from Asia, Europe, North America, and Antarctica.

Taxonomy and phylogeny 

The fungus was first described in 1877 by the British botanist Mordecai Cubitt Cooke, based on specimens sent to him that had been found growing on the walls, ceilings, and floors of a house in Edinburgh that had been partially destroyed by fire. The species was transferred to genus Aleuria by Ethel Irene McLennan & Halsey in 1936, and later into Galactinia by Irma J. Gamundi in 1960; both of the binomials resulting from these generic transfers are synonyms of P. domiciliana.

Peziza domiciliana is commonly known as the "domicile cup fungus".

Description 
The fruit bodies of P. domicilia are cup-shaped; initially concave, they later develop an undulating margin and a depressed center. The outer surface of the cup is whitish, and the margin of the cup can either remain intact, or split. The inner surface of the cup is the fertile, spore-bearing hymenium; it is initially white before turning buff, tan, or brownish.

The asci (the spore-bearing cells) are cylindrical or roughly so, reaching dimensions of 225–250 μm long by 15 μm wide. The spores are ellipsoid, hyaline (translucent) when young, often contain two small oil droplets, and measure 11–15 by 6–10 μm. The paraphyses are slender, contain septa, and are slightly enlarged above. The species is inedible.

Similar species 

Peziza domiciliana is similar in appearance to P. repanda and has often been mistaken for it. Peziza badia is darker brown, grows on the ground or well-decayed wood, and has longer spores measuring 15–19 by 7–10 μm. Other Peziza species have been reported to grow indoors, including P. varia and P. petersii.

Habitat and distribution 
The fruit bodies of Peziza domiciliana grow singly, in groups, or in clusters on plaster, sand, gravel and coal-dust in cellars, caves, and greenhouses. The species is known from Europe, North America, and South America (Argentina). The fungus has been identified as one of several responsible for the degradation of construction wood used in historical monuments in Moldavia. It has also been recorded from Deception Island of Antarctica, and from the eastern Himalayas. The fungus has been implicated in a case of hypersensitivity pneumonitis (called El Niño lung in the original report), in which a previously healthy woman developed severe dyspnea and was found to have restrictive lung disease and evidence of alveolitis. A search of her home, which had recently been flooded as a result of heavy rains, revealed the mushroom in her basement, and air sampling confirmed the presence of P. domiciliana spores.

References

External links 

Fungi described in 1877
Fungi of Asia
Fungi of Europe
Fungi of North America
Inedible fungi
Pezizaceae
Fungi of Antarctica
Taxa named by Mordecai Cubitt Cooke